John Matthew Forsyth was a Scottish professional footballer who played as a defender, mainly for Aberdeen.

Forsyth joined Aberdeen in 1920 from Junior club Glasgow Perthshire. After almost 200 appearances, he left the club in 1926. Forsyth was one of Aberdeen's first recipients of a benefit game, a 4–4 draw against a former Aberdeen select in 1926.

References

Year of birth missing
Footballers from Glasgow
Association football defenders
Scottish footballers
Aberdeen F.C. players
Scottish Football League players
Glasgow Perthshire F.C. players
Highland Football League players
Keith F.C. players
Forres Mechanics F.C. players
Scottish Junior Football Association players
Scotland junior international footballers